Gretta Sarfaty, born Alegre Sarfaty, is also known as Gretta Grzywacz and Greta Sarfaty Marchant, also simply as Gretta. is a painter, photographer and multimedia artist who earned international acclaim in the 1970s, from her artistic works related to Body art and Feminism. Born in Greece, in 1947, she moved with her family to São Paulo in 1954, being naturalized as Brazilian. 

Alongside her art she was the founder of the artist-run space, Sartorial Contemporary Art (2005–2010), and since 2010 she keeps an art collection called Alegre Sarfaty Collection.

From the 1970's on, Gretta developed her artistic career. She took fine arts classes in São Paulo, at FAAP and the Escola Pan Americana de Artes - she was taught by artists working also in São Paulo, including Walter Lewy, Ivald Granato, Mário Gruber and Savério Castellano. She studied photography with the photographer Julio Abe Wakahara during 1975. Due to her artistic work and exhibitions, she moved to Paris, Milan and New York.

Gretta exhibited her work at institutions such as Museu de Arte Contemporânea da Universidade de São Paulo (MAC/USP), Museu de Arte Moderna de São Paulo (MAM/SP),  Museu de Arte de São Paulo (MASP),  Museu Nacional de Belas Artes (MNBA),  Pinacoteca do Estado de São Paulo, Instituto Moreira Salles  (SP/RJ),  (MAP),  Musée d'Art Moderne de la Ville de Paris, Museo MACRO Asilo, Palazzo dei Diamanti di Ferrara, Foundation Calouste Gulbenkian, Fundação Vera Chaves Barcellos (FVCB),  Centre Georges Pompidou, Internationaal Cultureel Centrum, New York University (NYU), among others.

Personal life
Gretta was born in Athens in 1947 and was named Alegre Sarfaty, from parents of Italian, Greek and Turkish origin. In 1954, her family moved to São Paulo, Brazil. 

At the age of 17 she married José Grzywacz; she has three children from this marriage: Victoria Sarfaty Grzywacz, Pedro Grzywacz and Rafaela Grzywacz Goodman. 

Nowadays, the artist is established in Sao Paulo,Brazil, spending some brief periods of the year between New York, London and Italy.

Artistic career
Throughout her career Gretta exhibited mainly in São Paulo, New York and London. In the 70s she participated in numerous solo shows in Brazil displaying her early paintings. Her world travels and mixed background has had an important influence on her more contemporary visual work – particularly her photography and collages which deal in themes of identity and culture, although her art is not restricted just to the canvas. Marchant's work embraces a wide range of media including installation, photography, video, paintings and performance.

Brazil and Europe
At the beginning of the 1970s she started creating the series of paintings, Metamorphosis and her work was noted by the Brazilian gallerist, Franco Terranova. In 1975 he participated in the Bienal Internacional de Arte de São Paulo. In 1976 he showed her works in the Galeria de Arte Global, in São Paulo. In 1979 she had several shows in Germany (Karlsruhe) and in Italy (Galleria Diagramma, Milan; Palazzo dei Diamanti, Ferrara) and also in Paris, Centre Georges Pompidou, where she performed the Evocative Recollections. In 1980 she held the exhibition Evocative Recollections & Transformations at the Museu de Arte Contemporânea (MAC/São Paulo). In 1983 she created a series of paintings with a book, dedicated to the Brazilian culture, Self-Portrait of Brazil, a publication containing a series of paintings by the artist and texts about important personalities from the country that was exhibited at the Museu de Arte de São Paulo (MASP) and in 2011 participated in the exhibition Arte como Registro, Registro como Arte, na Pinacoteca do Estado de São Paulo.

Auto-Photos 
This series of photos from 1976 is one of the first Marchant's artworks dedicated to female identity and its various demonstrations: her face appears in sequences of beauty and ugliness, grace and madness. A frivolous play with recurrent images of herself is in fact an ironic dialogue with the constructed cultural image of a woman. Marchant expresses in this series the notion of gender performativity, a term created by Judith Butler in 1988.

Roberto Pontual wrote about this work:

The work of Gretta has been originally more related to the language of photography, especially during her recent stay in Europe. Her main focus has always been the female body, including her own body as a symbol of women's condition in our society.

Transformations 
Here the topic of deconstructing the female image gains even more strength. Marchant's face is being manipulated and distorted:

Rather than the manifestation of personal destructive tendencies, these images should be viewed as the externalisation of a revolt directed against the male cultural stereotype, mortifying as it does the feminine form into the authoritarian and distorting dimension of an abstract and aesthetic beauty, to which the artist opposes the angry vision of a reverse side, through a body that is deformed, disfigured and fragmented.

A Women's Diary 
Another work from 1976 where Marchant uses photography to create a diary of her own body, captured in almost abstract poses. The way that the body appears on the photos calls into question its materiality.

Evocative Recollections 

In 1979 she performed Evocative Recollections (performance with catalogue) in Centre Georges Pompidou, Paris, as well as in Palazzo dei Diamanti di Ferrara, Italy. This performance was then shown in different locations in Belgium (Internationaal Cultureel Centrum, Antewerp), Brazil and Italy. Under the same title, Evocative Recollections, Marchant continued the topic of female body and women's liberation in the series of photos (1980–1981). In an essay published for Marchant's solo exhibition at the Centro Culturale La Filanda (Verano Italy) Gillo Dorfles wrote about this series:

Sure: such pictures will not be the same with another artist, with another option, however, even considered under a point of view of photographic document, Gretta's corporeal options reach an unusual efficacy. We are in front of a little common combination, between the creative activity of an artist who knows how to enjoy the expressive dynamic and plastic possibilities of her body and the realisation of a photographic documentation which remains autonomous as well as in its technical as in its aesthetic values.

New York
In 1983 Marchant moved to New York and after a traumatic event, the fire in the Hotel Chelsea, she began a collaboration with American video and multimedia artists (InterComm group). She also started to discover Kabbalah esoteric thought: she became friends with Simon Jacobson and Kenny Vance and she decided to picture the Kabbalah community in her paintings (Kabbalah, 1984–1985). She also created a performance, Goya Time (1985) and a video, My Single Life in New York (1987).

By the time she was represented by the New York-based gallery, Foster Goldstrom Fine Arts, she was involved in the artistic and cultural life of the city and she got to know Arthur Penn, with whom she collaborated in 1993 on his film The Portrait.

Some important exhibitions held in New York were Body Works at the Foster Goldstrom Gallery in 1983. The same year he participated in the Body Works & Evocative Recollections at the Keith Green Gallery. In 1984 he had his work exhibited at the inauguration of the Trump Tower.

Body Works 
In the late 80s and early 90s Marchant created a photographic series of Body Works, where naked bodies constitute a denunciation of the hedonistic and alienating practices to which the female form is submitted, a denunciation of the repression and mystification to which women's education exposes them from every direction. And they are an affirmation of the real sensuality of women, which respectability nonetheless still attempts to hide or to repress (the curtain or the mosquito net). And so, like gallery owner Romana Loda, we can quote Hugo Von Hofmannsthal when he said: "The profound should be hidden. Where? On the surface".

Gretta & Becheroni: Change and Appropriation of an Autonomous Identity 
Video made in 1980 in collaboration with Elvio Becheroni. Marchant perform in a cube made of paper ribbons, making herself a passage through the space. It is a metaphoric way to the new identity. This work evidences the prison of the woman in the society through its voyeuristic aspect, evoking a ritual of liberation. This work was exhibited in the Pinacoteca do Estado de São Paulo and in other countries like Argentina, Italy and the USA.  Vídeo Gretta & Becheroni: Change and Appropriation of an Autonomous Identity, 1980.

Goya Time 
Inter-disciplinary multimedia event with 100 artists, curated by Marchant, Sandro Dernini and Butch Morris. Marchant wrote a script and directed this art opera inspired by Francisco de Goya's artworks. The performance took place in 1985, in "Quando", church and a car park at the Lower East Side, New York. Vídeo La Maja, Goya Time, 1985.

Virtual Body Works 1988/2013 
During the Spring of 1987 Marchant was invited to participate in an interactive telecommunications event, Who Killed Heinrich Hertz?, created by InterComm (Timothy Binkley, George M. Chaikin, Ira Schneider and Willoughby Sharp). She became involved in collaborative work with each of the above video artist. In 1988 Ira Schneider created a video dedicated to Marchant.

Myth 
Video produced by Denny Daniel, in 2003. It is a compilation of snapshots of Marchant, manipulated with a kaleidoscopic effect and juxtaposed with scenes from Marchant's everyday life. The structure of the movie remains the style of music videos from the late 80s.

London
In 1995 she moved to London and married Richard Marchant, "the leading Oriental ceramics dealer". She continued creating photography related to questions of femininity and identity and was represented for the gallery Wolseley Fine Arts. From 2005, he founded his own artist-run gallery, Sartorial Contemporary Arts, a gallery designed to promote exhibitions of young artists as well as his own.

Reflections of a Woman 
Woman as a central artistic subject appears not only in her auto-portraits but also in the series of paintings dedicated to an issue of female identity and body, Reflections of a Woman (1997). It was exhibited in the Wolseley Fine Arts, London, in 1997.

In this series of paintings Gretta is talking not only about herself, but also about other women. She has found a way to represent women's nature. It is not her body any more, but every woman's body. They can still be self-portraits, but they also are portraits of the women of today, full of confidence about their own identity and conscious of their power.

Myth of Womanhood, 2001-2005 

The title itself is a provocative statement by the artist in relation to the Female versus Feminism issue, and how the use and abuse of that subject has now become a cliché. The series consists of one photographic image which is duplicated several times to form a stimulating kaleidoscopic final picture. The Myth of Womanhood marks Gretta's return to performance art, however in this instance the performance is only for the camera.

Youth Versus Gravity, 2001-2005 

In this series, Gretta manipulated mirrors and their reflections to have a complete view of the subject from different angles. Separate images were used to create fun compositions through symmetry, which are intended to transport the viewer back to the illusion of childhood. In Youth Versus Gravity, the artist has been guided by issues related to longevity.

Permutations, 2009 
The installation is a cosmological ricochet which is conceptualized through repeated images of bananas, self portraits and geometric exegesis in ordered sequences in front of a symbol of the Shield of David.  Here Gretta is interested in synchronicity and meaningful coincidences.

Recent activity
In 2005 she opened her own gallery, Sartorial Contemporary Art. In October 2008 this moved to a larger space in Kings Cross. Marchant has curated several of its shows including Notting Heaven (2008), Mothers (2008), Remember My Name (2008), Burning Candy (2008), Obsession (2006) and Water (2006). Along with Jasper Joffe and Harry Pye she has been a co-editor of The Rebel magazine.

In 2010 she has exhibited in the show Bad Girls, together with Marina Abramović, Annette Messager, Orlan and Gina Pane. The concept of the exhibition was to compare four generation of female artists since the 70s. In 2011 her works were shown in an exhibition at the Pinacoteca do Estado de São Paulo Arte como registro, registro como arte, documenting the history of art performance in Brazil. The show highlights Marchant as one of the few Brazilian artists to ever exhibited at the Centre Georges Pompidou. One year later she participated in Foto/Gráfica – a New History of the Latin-American Photobook (where she exhibited her Autho-Photos), at Le Bal, Paris and Libriste – Dalla collezione di libri d'artista di Marco Carminati: Gretta Sarfaty & Elvio Becheroni . Modificazione e appropriamento di una identita autonoma at the Instituzione Biblioteca Classense in Ravenna, Italy. In 2013 she had works exhibited in the show Ainda: O livro como Performance  curated by Amir Brito Cadôr at the Museu de Arte da Pampulha in Belo Horizonte, Brazil. In 2015 participated in the exhibition Reenactment: Videoarte no Palazzo Dei Diamanti, Ferrara, Italy.

In 2018 the Museu de Arte Moderna de São Paulo (MAM) celebrated its 70th anniversary in partnership with the Museu de Arte Contemporânea (MAC) in which Gretta's work Auto-Photos were exhibited. This same year she opened his solo exhibition "Reconciliation" at Galeria Pilar in São Paulo.

The exhibition at Galeria Pilar in São Paulo represents the first individual of the artist in Brazil after the period when she lived out of the country, dividing her work between New York and London. "Reconciliation" brings a new series of works where the body, an outstanding element of Safarty's artistic career, returns to the painting, video art, engraving and photograph presents at the exhibition. This same body who stared the more known works from the artist, presents itself in the intimate and familiar context of the reunion.

In 2019, Gretta starts to be represented by Central Galeria, opening the exhibition "Dos nossos espaços vazios internos˜, which brings together vintage works, produced between the years 1970 and 1980, from the series Body Works, Metamorphic Recollections and Diário de uma mulher. In December 2019, Gretta opened the exhibition Reconciliações at the Instituto dos Arquitetos do Brasil, a project contemplated by the Cultural Incentive Law - Lei Rouanet. Gretta also participated in the group exhibition "Estratégias do Feminino" at Farol Santander in Porto Alegre, the show brings together about 95 works by 53 female artists, produced between the beginning of the 20th century and up to the present day.

Also in 2019, Gretta started to be represented by an international gallery, Galeria Nuno Centeno, located in Porto, Portugal. In 2020, Gretta will participate in a solo exhibition at the gallery, scheduled to take place in May.

Alegre Sarfaty Collection 
The Alegre Sarfaty Collection of contemporary art is a privately own family trust. It was established in 2010 and keeps growing thanks to the enthusiasm of Greta Sarfaty. Some of the artists included in the collection are: Cory Arcangel, Tauba Auerbach, Jonathan Binet, Jules de Balincourt, Jean-Baptiste Bernadet, Walead Beshty, Joe Bradley, Matti Braun, Dan Colen, Sebastian Dacey, Andrew Dadson, Luca Dellaverson, Thomas Demand, Ida Ekblad, Roe Ethridge, Thilo Heinzmann, Matias Faldbakken, Alberto Fiori, Ryan Gander, Liam Gillick, Alex Israel, Wyatt Kahn, Jordan Kasey, Jacob Kassay, Annette Kelm, Ian Kiaer, Friedrich Kunath, Elad Lassry, Michael De Lúcia, Jason Martin, Landon Metz, Trevor Paglen, Nicolas Party, Eddie Peake, Alex Prager, Neil Raitt, Dan Rees, Sterling Ruby, Max Ruf, Thomas Ruff, Albert Samson, Wilhelm Sasnal, Gedi Sibony, Andreas Slominski, Josh Smith, Wolfgang Tillmans.

Exhibitions

Selected solo exhibitions
 2019 - Reconciliações - IAB - Instituto dos Arquitetos do Brasil, São Paulo, Brasil.
 2019 - Dos nossos espaços vazios internos - Central Galeria, São Paulo, Brasil.
 2018 - Reconciliação - Galeria Pilar, São Paulo, Brazil.
2013 - Familia Memorabilis, Wedding Pictures and Sartorial Giveaway of a Lifetime! (Paintings, photos, video and installation). Marchant's project led-space, Kings Cross, London
2010 - Through a Glass Darkly (photos, performance). Film by Gordon Beswick, Sartorial Contemporary Art, London
2009 - Gretta's Permutations (installation and video). The show features "Gretta's Progress" by Gordon Beswick, a half-hour documentary about Gretta's life since the 80s, London
2008 - Gretta's Progress (photos, performance with catalogue) at Leeds College of Art & Design. Curated by Harry Pye and Olly Beck, Leeds, UK
2006 - X-RAY at the Perseverance, London
2003 - Life Works (solo exhibition) – 473 Broadway Gallery, New York, US
2002 - Myth of Womanhood & Youth versus Gravity (with catalogue) Sartorial Contemporary Art. Curated by Julia Weiner, Head of Education at the Courtauld Institute of Art, London
1999 - The World of Horseracing (with catalogue) The National Horseracing Museum of Newmarket, UK 
1999 - The World of Horseracing (with catalogue) Wolseley Fine Artes, london, UK
1997 - Reflections of a Woman(with catalogue), Wolseley Fine Arts, London.
1994 – The Brazilian, Washington, US.
1993 - Body Works (performance and photos with catalogue) – exhibited in Foster Goldstrom Gallery, New York and also in Jansen-Perez Gallery, Los Angeles and San Antonio, Texas.
1988 - Europa, França e Bahia – Museu da Imagem e do Som e Paço das Artes,. Marchant's retrospective of 15 years of works (with catalogue) comprising paintings, videos, performances, lectures and works in collaboration with Timothy Binkley, George Chaikin, Ira Schneider, Willoughby Sharp and others. Sponsored by the Brazilian Government. Curated by Marchant and Willoughby Sharp, São Paulo
1983 - Evocative Recollections (with catalogue) - Galeria A. Niemeyer, Rio de Janeiro, Brazil 
1983 - Auto-Retrato do Brasil – Museu Nacional de Belas Artes, Rio de Janeiro, Brazil
1981 - Evocative Recollections (with catalogue) - Galleria Multimedia, Brescia, Italia and Centro de Arte Euro-Americano, Caracas, Venezuela and Galeria Singular, Porto Alegre, Brazil and Galeria B14, Sttutgart, Germany.
1980 - Evocative Recollections and Transformations (performance with catalogue) - International Cultureel Centrum (ICC) - Antwerp, Belgium and Museu de Arte Contemporânea (MAC), São Paulo, Brazil. 
1980 - Evocative Recollections (with catalogue) - Galleria La Filanda, Veranno, Brianza, Italy and Galeria de Arte Parnaso - Brasilia, Brazil.
1980 - Gretta Sarfaty y La Autoimagen - Centro de Arte y Comunicación (CAYC), Buenos Aires
1980 - Transformations - Galleria Arte Verso, Genova, Italy and Galeria A, Niemeyer, Rio de Janeiro, Brazil
1979 - Evocative Recollections (performance with catalogue), Centre Georges Pompidou, Paris, France and Palazzo dei Diamanti di Ferrara, Italy 
1979 - Transformations - Galleria Diagramma, Milano, Italy and Galeria Papala, Karlsruhe, Germany and Galeria Andre Sigaud, Rio de Janeiro, Brazil 
1978 - Transformations (with catalogue) - Galeria Bonfiglioli, São Paulo, Brazil.
1976 - Metamorphosis (with catalogue) - Curated by Franco Terranova, Galeria de Arte Global, São Paulo, Brazil. 
1974 - Metamorphosis - Petite Galerie, Rio de Janeiro, Brazil 
1973 - Metamorphosis (with catalogue) - Galeria Documenta, São Paulo, Brazil.

Selected group exhibitions

 2019 - Estratégias do feminino - Farol Santander Porto Alegre, Brasil
 2018 - MAM 70: MAM e MAC exhibition of the 70th anniversary of the Museum in partnership with MAC/USP, MAM, São Paulo, Brazil
2018 - Plexus International Metr’Art – Museum MACRO Asilo, Rome, Italy
2018 - Apropriações, Variações e Neopalimpsestos - Fundação Vera Chaves Barcellos - Viamão, Porto Alegre
2016 - Exploring Spatial Environments by Women Artists in the 1960s and 1970s - Centro de Arte Moderna - Fundação Calouste Gulbekian, Lisboa, Portugal.
2015 -  Reenactment: Videoarte a Palazzo Dei Diamanti: 1973-1979. Ferrara, Italy
2015 – Destino dos Objetos, Sala dos Pomares, Viamão, Brazil.
2013 - Fotolivros Latino-Americanos. Curadoria de Horacio Hernandez. Instituto Moreira Salles, São Paulo e Rio de Janeiro, Brazil.
2013 - Ainda: Livro como Performance. Curadoria de Amir Brito Cadôr no Museu de Arte da Pampulha, Belo Horizonte, Brazil.
2013 - Fronteiras Incertas: Arte e Fotografia no Acervo do MAC USP – Museu de Arte Contemporânea MAC USP Ibirapuera, São Paulo, Brazil.
2012 -  Libriste. Dalla collezione di libri d'artista di Marco Caminati; Gretta & Becheroni: modificazione e appropriamento di un’identita’ autonoma. Istituzione Biblioteca Classense, Ravenna, Italy
2012 - A New History of the Latin-American Photobook, Fóto/Gráfica Gretta Auto-Photos – Le Bal, Paris
2011 - Arte Como Registro, Registro Como Arte (performance with film)   – Pinacoteca do Estado de São Paulo, Brazil
2011 - Performative, Jake and Dinos Chapman, Nicola Ruben Montini and Marchant, Sartorial Contemporary Art, London
2010 - Bad Girls: Good girls go to heaven, bad girls go everywhere, along with Marina Abramović, Annette Messager, Orlan and Gina Pane, which were compared four generation of female artists, Italy
2008 - Again and Again, Marchant and Mister Solo, East London College of Art, London
2006 - Black History Month, Lewisham Library. Curated by Harry Pye, London
2006 - Half Life, Fieldgate Gallery, London
2005 - People Like Us (with publication), Nomoregrey Gallery, London
2005 - Bodynobody, curated by Luciano Inga Pin and Giuseppe Savoca, Milan
2005 - The Oh House & The Night on Earth, The Oxford House, Curated by Harry Pye, London
2000 - Arte Conceitual e Conceitualismos: anos 70 no acervo do MAC/USP - Galeria de Arte do Sesi, São Paulo, Brazil.
1989 – The Prisoners of Art, New York, US.
1989 – Goya Time, New York, US.
1988 – Expo Brasil – China, Gallery of Fine Arts of China, Beijing, China.
1987 - Art in Mind, La Viande Gallery, London
1987 - Summer Solstice '87, Art Performance 'The Marriage,' Marchant and Willoughby Sharp in WNYC-TV special by Charlie Morrow with: John Cage, Melissa Fenley, Philip Glass, Butch Morris, NY
1985 - Purgatorio Show ’85 New York, at C.U.A.N.D.O., organised by Willoughby Sharp Studio, Plexus & Sandro Dernini, New York
1981 - International Triennal of Drawings, Warsaw, Poland
1980 - Espaces Libres, Musée d'Art Moderne de la Ville de Paris, France
1977 - Internacional Woman in Arts, Große Orangerie Schloss Charlottenburg, Berlim, Alemanha.
1977 - Poéticas Visuais. São Paulo, Brasil.
1977 - 9° Panorama de Arte Atual Brasileira. Museu de Arte Moderna de São Paulo, São Paulo, Brasil.
1976 - 8° Panorama de Arte Atual Brasileira. Museu de Arte Moderna de São Paulo, São Paulo, Brasil.
1976 - Bienal Nacional 76, Fundação Bienal de São Paulo, São Paulo, Brazil.
1976 - 10º Arte e Pensamento Ecológico, São Paulo, Brasil.
1975 - XIII Bienal Internacional de Arte de São Paulo - São Paulo, Brazil

Curating art
Marchant curated almost all exhibitions organised in the Sartorial Contemporary Art gallery, which she run for eight years (2005–2013).

In 2009 she was a judge for the competition, Presenting the Top 100, organised in partnership with PRS for Music and Jealous Gallery, London.

Other shows curated by Marchant have included:

 Fortless Sartorial, an Interactive Performance Installation by Jeni Snell and Group exhibition with Panick’s workshops, Corams Fields Youth Resource Centre and South Camden Youth Access Point. Sponsored by the Arts Council, O2 and Camden Council, London, 2009
 Burning Candy (with catalogue and film) – Leeds College of Art and Design, Leeds, 2008
 It Takes Two: James Jessop versus Harry Pye (with publication), Fish Market at South Market, London, 2007
 Europa Franca & Bahia in Museu da Imagem e do Som and Museu Paco des Artes (with catalogue) Marchant's 15 years of work, exhibition sponsored by the Brazilian Government, in 1988
 La Maja in Goya Time, Art Opera Multi-Media Event (100 creators interacting together at 'Quando', Church and Courtyard), New York, 1985

Public Collections 
Euro-American Art Center, Caracas / Brazil Brazilian Broadcasting Corp., Brazil / ICC - International Cultureel Centrum, Antwerp / Itau Bank, São Paulo / Galleria La Filanda, Veranno-Brianza / Milan Globo TV / S. J. Phillips, UK / Lubavitcher Foundation, São Paulo / New York Times, USA / MAC - Museu de Arte Contemporânea, São Paulo / MACS – Museu de Arte Contemporânea de Sorocaba/ MAM - Museo de Arte Moderna, Cuenca, Ecuador / MAP – Museu de Arte da Pampulha/ MASP - Museu de Arte de São Paulo, São Paulo / MIS - Museu de Imagem e do Som, São Paulo / MNBA - Museu Nacional de Belas Artes, São Paulo / Musee d'Art Moderne de La Ville de Paris, Paris / Museu da Pinacoteca do Estado de São Paulo, São Paulo / Museu Paço das Artes, São Paulo New York Hospital, Department of Psychiatry, USA / Palazzo dei Diamanti, Ferrara, Italy / Pinacoteca do Estado de São Paulo, São Paulo / Republic National Bank of New York, New York / Safra National Bank of New York, New York / The Meaningful Life Centre, Brooklyn, USA / USP - Universidade de São Paulo, São Paulo / Varig - Brazilian Airlines, Brazil / Vasp - Brazilian Airlines, Brazil / Euro-American Art Center, Caracas.

Bibliography
ARTE Global 77. São Paulo: Galeria ARTE Global, 1977. , il. p.b. SPgag 1977
 Burning Candy (catátogo), Leeds College of Art and Design, Leeds, 2008.
CADÔR, Amir. Ainda, o livro como performance. Catálogo da exposição no Museu de Arte da Pampulha, Brasil, 2013.
Catalogue of the Exhibition MAM 70, 1948-2018. Museu de Arte Moderna de São Paulo, 2018. 
 CALLINGS, Matthew. Modern Painters, London, 2006, pp. 34–35.
 CANDELA, Alessandra Gagliano. Bad Girls: good girls go to heaven, bad girls go everywhere, in: Art Key. Magazine d'Arte Moderna e Contemporanea, 2010.
DINAMBRO, Nadiesda. Imagens de Gretta Sarfaty: Fotografia, Performance e Gênero. Dissertação de Mestrado, 2018
 DORFLES, GILLO. Ultime Tendenze nell’Arte d’Oggi, Dall'informale al neo-oggettuale, Milano, 2004.
DORFLES, GILLO.  Texto La Body Art In: revista L’Arte Moderna, número 112.
DUNCAN, Catarina. Dos nossos espaços vazios internos. Texto para exposição de mesmo nome na Central Galeria, 2019. 
FERNANDEZ, Horacio. Fotolivros Latino-Americanos, Cosac Naify, São Paulo, 2011
 "FÓTO/GRAFICA" A New History of the Latin-American Photobook, LensCulture, 31 January 2012.
GANHITO, Lidia Cesaro Penha. O corpo também é um lugar: Narrativas de subjetividade em Gretta Sarfaty, 2019.
 GRETTA & BACHERONI. Modificazione e Appropriamento di una identità autonoma (catálogo), Prearo Editore, 1980.
 Gretta Marchant: "Life Works", in: New York Arts Magazine, Vol. 8, February 2003.
 Gretta . In: ENCICLOPÉDIA Itaú Cultural de Arte e Cultura Brasileiras. São Paulo: Itaú Cultural, 2018. Acesso em: 16 de Abr. 2018. Verbete da Enciclopédia. 
 GRETTA. Auto-retrato do Brasil: retratos e depoimentos de 50 personagens. Tradução Bibiana Marie Anna Rys; tradução Nancy Cristina Martorana, Elvio Becheroni, Patrizia Olivieri; apresentação Sabina de Libman; fotografia Romulo Fialdini. São Paulo: Arte aplicada, 1983. 147 p., il.
 GRETTA. Europa, França & Bahia. São Paulo: MIS : Paço das Artes, 1988. 16 p., il. p&b. color.
 GRETTA. Gretta Sarfaty: Soho scenes: desenhos e pinturas. São Paulo: Renato Magalhães Gouvêa Escritório de Arte, 1993. , il. p&b. color., fot. G834 1993.
 GUIMARÃES, Andréa Camargo... (et al.) Cronologia de artes plásticas : referências 1975-1995 – São Paulo : Centro Cultural São Paulo-IDART, 2010.
 KLINTOWITZ, Jacob. Uma viagem pelo ego de Gretta Sarfaty. Jornal da Tarde, São Paulo, 14 March 1988. Não catalogado
 LODA, Romana. Gretta: um tentativo de amor. Galleria Multimedia (Brescia), 1981.
MAGALHÃES, Fabio. Ousadias, afetos e memórias. Texto para exposição e catálogo Reconciliações no IAB – Instituto dos Arquitetos do Brasil, 2020.
 Marco Carminati, Dino Silvestroni, Marta Zocchi, Libriste dalla Collezione di Libri d’Artista di Marco Carminati, introduction by: Ada de Pirro, Instituzione Biblioteca Classense, Ravenna, March 2012.
 Mike Higgins, Gretta: Reflections of a Woman, in: Independent Newspaper London, December 1997.
 PANORAMA DE ARTE ATUAL BRASILEIRA, São Paulo, 1976. Pintura. Apresentação de Paulo Mendes de Almeida. São Paulo: MAM, 1976.
SILVEIRA, Paulo. A página violada, da ternura à injúria na construção do livro de artista. Editora da UFRGS, Porto Alegre, RS, Brasil, 2008.
 POÉTICAS visuais. Apresentação de Walter Zanini. Texto de Júlio Plaza. São Paulo: MAC/USP, 1977.
 Mini-doc em 3 partes sobre a trajetória de Gretta Sarfaty: Gretta's Progress I; Gretta's Progress II; Gretta's Progress III.
Exhibition Catalogue MAM and MAC: 70 Years.
TRIZOLI, Talita. Atravessamentos feministas: Um panorama de mulheres artistas no Brasil dos anos 60/70. Tese de Doutorado, 2018.
TRIZOLI, Talita. A través de um espejo: subjetivaciones femeninas en el arte brasileño de los años setenta. Revista Errata#17, Colombia, 2017.
VERZOTTI, Giorgio. Gretta / Diagramma. Magazine G7 Studio. Itália, (Abril, 1979)

Notes

References

External links
 
 Alegre Sarfaty Collection

1947 births
Living people
20th-century Brazilian women artists
21st-century Brazilian women artists
20th-century Greek women artists
21st-century Greek women artists
Artists from Athens
Brazilian contemporary artists
Greek contemporary artists
Brazilian curators
Brazilian people of Greek descent
Women performance artists
Feminist artists